is a Japanese former professional footballer who played as a centre-back.

Club career
Born in Palmeira d'Oeste, Brazil to an Italian Brazilian mother and second generation Japanese Brazilian father, Tulio moved to Japan at age 15 to complete his high school studies. After graduation from Shibuya Makuhari High School in Chiba Prefecture in 2001, Tulio joined the J1 League club Sanfrecce Hiroshima. In the opening game of the 2001 season on 11 March, he debuted as substitute defender in the tenth minute replacing the injured Tony Popovic, and scored a goal in the 16th minute. After the debut, he played many matches as centre-back in two seasons. Sanfrecce was relegated to J2 League end of 2002 season.

In 2003, Tulio moved to fellow J2 League side Mito HollyHock. On 10 October 2003, he received approval to naturalise as a Japanese citizen. Playing as a centre-back, he scored ten goals in the 2003 season.

In 2004, after a season at Mito, Tulio returned to the J1 League, joining Urawa Red Diamonds. After the strong performance in 2006 season, which led Urawa to win their first ever J1 League title, he received J.League Most Valuable Player. In 2007, Urawa won their first Asian champions in AFC Champions League. On 22 December 2009, after falling out with the management at Urawa as he was deployed in an unfamiliar position at the back, Tulio joined Nagoya Grampus. He played 168 games and scored 37 goals in 6 seasons and was selected in the team's Best Eleven every season.

In his first season in Nagoya, Nagoya won the champions in 2010 J1 League first time in the club history. Nagoya also won the 2nd place in 2011 season. On 9 January 2016, Nagoya Grampus announced that the club and Tulio were parting ways. Nearly nine months later, on 28 August 2016, Tulio re-signed for Nagoya Grampus under new manager Boško Gjurovski, before leaving Nagoya Grampus at the end of the 2016 season upon the expiration of his contract.

In the off-season of the 2016–17 season, at the age of 35, Tulio signed with J2 club Kyoto Sanga FC.

International career
Tulio obtained his Japanese citizenship on 10 October 2003. He played for the Japan U23 national team at the 2004 Olympic Games. He played as centre-back in full time in all three matches.

Tulio made his debut for the Japan's senior national team on 9 August 2006, against Trinidad and Tobago. He scored his first goal for Japan on 15 November 2006 in a 2007 Asian Cup qualifier against Saudi Arabia.

He missed 2007 AFC Asian Cup finals due to an injury. His absence was a big blow to the Japan national team.

He was selected Japan for 2010 FIFA World Cup. On 30 May, he scored for Japan against England in the 7th minute of a World Cup warm-up, and also scored for England against Japan in the form of an own goal 67 minutes later. As Japan's captain Yuji Nakazawa later did the same thing, the game finished 2–1 for England. On 4 June, he scored for Ivory Coast against Japan in the form of an own goal in the 13th minute of a friendly match. Three minutes later, he injured Côte d'Ivoire attacker Didier Drogba's elbow which was fractured by a high challenge from Tulio.

At the 2010 FIFA World Cup, he played full time in all four matches as center back with Yuji Nakazawa. Japan qualified to the knockout stage. This tournament is his last match for Japan. He played 43 games and scored 8 goals for Japan.

Career statistics

Club

International

Scores and results list Japan's goal tally first, score column indicates score after each Tulio goal.

Honours
Urawa Red Diamonds
 AFC Champions League: 2007
 J1 League: 2006
 Emperor's Cup: 2005, 2006
 Japanese Super Cup: 2006

Nagoya Grampus
 J1 League: 2010
 Japanese Super Cup: 2011

Japan
 Kirin Cup: 2007, 2008, 2009

Individual
 Japanese Footballer of the Year: 2006
 J.League Most Valuable Player: 2006
 J.League Best Eleven: 2004, 2005, 2006, 2007, 2008, 2009, 2010, 2011, 2012

References

External links

 
 
 Japan National Football Team Database
 
 Japan national team profile
Profile at Kyoto Sanga FC

1981 births
Living people
Japanese footballers
Japan international footballers
J1 League players
J2 League players
Sanfrecce Hiroshima players
Mito HollyHock players
Urawa Red Diamonds players
Nagoya Grampus players
Kyoto Sanga FC players
Olympic footballers of Japan
Footballers at the 2004 Summer Olympics
2010 FIFA World Cup players
Japanese Footballer of the Year winners
J1 League Player of the Year winners
Expatriate footballers in Japan
Brazilian expatriate footballers
Brazilian footballers

Japanese people of Italian descent
Brazilian emigrants to Japan
Brazilian people of Italian descent
Footballers from São Paulo
Brazilian people of Japanese descent
Association football defenders
Naturalized citizens of Japan